The Newcastle-upon-Tyne by-election was a Parliamentary by-election held on 25 September 1908. The constituency returned two Members of Parliament (MP) to the House of Commons of the United Kingdom, elected by the first past the post voting system.

Vacancy
Thomas Cairns had been Liberal MP for the seat of Newcastle-upon-Tyne since the 1906 general election. He died on 3 September 1908.

Electoral history
The seat had been Liberal since they gained it in 1906;

Candidates

The local Liberal Association selected 46-year-old Edward Shortt to defend the seat. The son of a Newcastle upon Tyne Church of England vicar, he was called to the Bar at the Middle Temple in 1890 and practised on the North Eastern Circuit. He had served as Recorder (part-time judge) of Sunderland since 1907.

The Conservatives retained 58-year-old George Renwick as their candidate. Renwick was elected to Parliament in 1900 as Conservative member for Newcastle-upon-Tyne, serving from 1900 until his defeat in 1906. Renwick was born in Newcastle upon Tyne. He joined shipowners Pyman, Bell & Co as a clerk and then co-founded his own business, Fisher, Renwick & Co. He had particularly large interests in drydocks, including the world's first ever floating repair docks, the Tyne Pontoons at Wallsend, which he sold to Swan Hunter & Wigham Richardson Ltd in 1903.

The Newcastle Independent Labour Party selected J. J. Stephenson as a candidate. This was in conflict with the electoral alliance that had existed between the Liberal and Labour parties. However, the Labour Party National Executive persuaded the Labour candidate to withdraw. The Social Democratic Federation, with the support of some local Independent Labour Party branches, then nominated their own candidate, 53-year-old Bradford man, Edward Hartley. Hartley had fought Bradford East at the last General election, finishing third. Before that he had fought Dewsbury at the 1895 general election and then the 1902 Dewsbury by-election.

Campaign
Polling day was fixed for the 25 September 1908, just 22 days after the death of the previous MP.

The constituency included at least 2,000 Irish voters, mainly Roman Catholics, who could normally be relied upon to vote Liberal. However, the Liberals banned the carrying of the Host in the Eucharistic Congress Procession in London earlier in the month, which was expected to cost them votes in Newcastle.

The SDF candidate antagonised the ILP and the local suffragists by refusing to pledge himself to oppose any future franchise reform restricted to manhood suffrage.

Result
The Conservatives gained the seat;

Aftermath
Shortt re-gained the seat from Renwick at the following General Election. Hartley returned to Bradford where he was again defeated at Bradford East;

References

Newcastle-upon-Tyne by-election
Newcastle-upon-Tyne by-election
Newcastle-upon-Tyne by-election
20th century in Newcastle upon Tyne
Elections in Newcastle upon Tyne
By-elections to the Parliament of the United Kingdom in Northumberland constituencies